Terai is a region in India, Nepal and Bhutan.

Terai or Tarai may also refer to:

Places 
 Terai, Ishikawa,  a former town in Japan
 Terai Station, a railway station in Nomi, Ishikawa Prefecture, Japan
 Tarai, Badin, a village in Pakistan

Other uses
 Tarai (function), a mathematical function
 Terai hat, a type of hat
 Bibhu Prasad Tarai (born 1964), Indian politician
 Shin Terai, Japanese musician and producer

See also 
 Terei (disambiguation)